Capsule endoscopy is a medical procedure used to record internal images of the gastrointestinal tract for use in disease diagnosis. Newer developments are also able to take biopsies and release medication at specific locations of the entire gastrointestinal tract. Unlike the more widely used endoscope, capsule endoscopy provides the ability to see the middle portion of the small intestine. It can be applied to the detection of various gastrointestinal cancers, digestive diseases, ulcers, unexplained bleedings, and general abdominal pains. After a patient swallows the capsule, it passes along the gastrointestinal tract, taking a number of images per second which are transmitted wirelessly to an array of receivers connected to a portable recording device carried by the patient. General advantages of capsule endoscopy over standard endoscopy include the minimally invasive procedure setup, ability to visualize more of the gastrointestinal tract, and lower cost of the procedure.

History 
Capsule endoscopy was first conceptualized by Israeli engineer Gavrial Iddan and Israeli gastroenterologist Eitan Scapa in Boston, MA in the early 1980s. The two partners first developed a CCD (charged coupled device) camera-based imaging system using a fiber-optic tether. This initial design suffered from high power consumption and slow transmission times of image data of at best 10 minutes. In 1993 Iddan had the idea to split the system into three components, the camera and transmitter, the recorder attached to a sensor array on the patient's abdomen, and a software package that processes the stored data at leisure by a physician at a later time. This new setup was made possible by the replacement of the CCD camera with a CMOS (complementary metal–oxide–semiconductor) camera. These cameras consume just one percent of the energy of their CCD counterparts. The more efficient power system allowed for the removal of the fiber optic cable for a stand-alone imaging system. This three-component imaging system remains popular today.

In 2001 the FDA (Food and Drug Administration) approved the first capsule endoscope developed by Given Imaging for use in patients. Many new models such as the PillCam SB and DBE for obscure gastrointestinal bleeding, the Olympus CE for the small bowel, the PillCam ESO for investigation of esophageal diseases, and the PillCam COLON for detection of colonic neoplasias have been created.

As research into capsule endoscopy has increased and technology has advanced better wireless and more energy-efficient systems have allowed for the creation of more compact capsules and image processing systems, with many in development today.

Technology 
Capsule endoscopy uses a small vitamin-sized wireless camera to capture images of a patient’s digestive tract. The capsule is generally composed of a camera, antenna, and light array. Due to the small nature of the device images can not be stored within it. As a result, a sensor array with a storage unit is placed on the abdomen of the patient for the imaging period. This storage unit can then be connected to a computer at a later time so that a medical professional can analyze the images.

Newer models of the capsule endoscope have looked to add camera systems on both ends of the pill or even store images within the pill itself to minimize the amount of medical equipment one must carry with them while using the device. For systems that store images directly within the pill, the pill must be collected after excretion for extraction of the images by a secondary device.

The main shortcoming of capsule endoscopy is the field of view. Depending on the placement of the camera system within the device images may become obstructed by folds in the digestive tract. Due to the passive nature of image capture and lack of control in maneuvering the device through the digestive tract novel solutions are being developed by various companies and research labs. For systems that utilize the setup with the camera system at the end of the capsule, the field of view ranges from 140 to 170 degrees.

There are several advantages to choosing to use capsule endoscopy over standard endoscopy. Standard endoscopy can be more uncomfortable for a patient, can be more prone to puncturing the digestive tract walls, and is not able to access the middle portion of the small intestine. Endoscopes must enter either through the mouth/nasal cavities or the rectum. Due to restrictions in length, extremely important regions for diagnosis in the small intestine are not able to be accessed. Currently, within the United States, capsule endoscopy can not be used as a primary imaging method over standard endoscopy first. As a result, many patients must first undergo standard endoscopy to then be referred for capsule endoscopy. Further innovation will be required to make capsule endoscopy comparable to the current standard of care, but extensive work is being performed to achieve this.

Medical uses 
Esophagogastroduodenoscopy (EGD), employs a camera attached to a long flexible tube to view the upper portion of the gastrointestinal tract, namely the esophagus, the stomach, and the beginning of the first part of the small intestine called the duodenum. A colonoscope, inserted through the rectum, can view the colon and the distal portion of the small intestine, the terminal ileum. These two types of endoscopy however cannot visualize the majority of the middle portion of the small intestine.

Capsule endoscopy is therefore used to examine parts of the gastrointestinal tract that cannot be seen by standard endoscopy. It is useful when the disease is suspected in the small intestine, and can sometimes be used to find the site of gastrointestinal bleeding or the cause of unexplained abdominal pain, such as Crohn's disease. However, unlike EGD or colonoscopy, it cannot be used to treat pathology that may be discovered. Common reasons for using capsule endoscopy include diagnosis of unexplained bleeding, iron deficiency, or abdominal pain, searching for polyps, ulcers, and tumors of the small intestine, and diagnosis of inflammatory bowel disease.

The images collected by the miniature camera during a session are transferred wirelessly to an external receiver worn by the patient, using any one of a band of appropriate frequencies. The collected images are then transferred to a computer for display, review, and diagnosis. A transmitted radio-frequency signal emitted by some capsules can be used to accurately estimate the location of the capsule and to track it in real-time inside the body and gastrointestinal tract. Capsule endoscopy can still not yet replace standard endoscopy for various diseases, as is the case for those with cirrhosis.

As of 2014, research was targeting additional sensing mechanisms and localization and motion control systems to enable new applications for the technology, for example, drug delivery. Wireless energy transmission was also being investigated as a way of providing a continuous energy source for the capsule.

Procedure
Capsule endoscopy requires a number of different preparatory procedures to ensure clear images are taken of a patient's gastrointestinal tract for an accurate diagnosis of disease. There are various types of capsule endoscopes, but for a generalized description, one can assume the most common setup requires the capsule, sensor array, storage unit, and computer system being used. First, a patient will need to have the sensor array placed on their abdomen with a recording unit worn as a belt. The patient may be asked to stay at the hospital or return home depending on the start time. Next, the pill must be swallowed by the patient. After approximately 8 hours the sensor array can be removed and returned to a physician. The capsule will be excreted through regular bowel movements.

During the procedure, there are a number of different policies to follow. A patient should only drink clear liquids for the first two hours after swallowing the pill and may eat after 4 hours. MRI studies, ham radios, metal detectors, and strenuous physical activity should all be avoided. Additionally, all external equipment must be kept dry.

Manufacturers 

As of 2022, there are a number of manufacturers who produce capsule endoscopes. The technology was originally developed by Israeli scientists, Gavriel Iddan and Eitan Scapa, with the first pill swallowed in 1997; Iddan founded Given Imaging in Israel which received FDA approval in 2001. Medtronic today produces one of the more widely used capsule endoscope systems called the PillCam having sold over 3.5 million units. Medtronic purchased the PillCam system from Given Imaging in 2014.

Side effects 
Capsule endoscopy is considered to be a very safe method for gastrointestinal tract examination. The capsule is usually excreted with a patient’s feces within 24–48 hours after ingestion. There has been a single report of retention of the capsule lasting almost four and a half years although the patient was asymptomatic. However, the risk of bowel obstruction may be countered by an abdominal X-ray to locate the device for removal by endoscopy or surgery.

Risk of retention 
In a review of 22,840 cases, the capsule was retained 1.4% of the time, with Crohn's disease a common cause; most were surgically removed. The rate of capsule retention varies by the indication for the procedure, with the highest rate seen with known Crohn's disease (5-13%), followed by obscure gastrointestinal bleeding (1.5%), suspected Crohn's disease (1.4%), and healthy volunteers (0%). Risk factors for capsule retention include Crohn's disease, NSAID use, and abdominal radiation.

References 

Endoscopy
Diagnostic gastroenterology
Israeli inventions
21st-century inventions